United Nations Security Council Resolution 688, adopted on 5 April 1991, after receiving letters from the representatives of France, Iran, and Turkey and expressing its concern over political repression of the Iraqi people, including those in Iraqi Kurdistan, the Council condemned the repression and demanded that Iraq, as a contribution to removing the threat to international peace and security, end the repression and respect the human rights of its population.

The Council insisted that Iraq allow access by international humanitarian organizations to the areas affected, requesting the Secretary-General to report on the Iraqi and Kurdish populations affected by repression from the Iraqi authorities, using all resources possible to address the needs of the population. It also demanded Iraq co-operate with the Secretary-General and international organizations to assist in humanitarian aid efforts.

The resolution was adopted by ten votes in favor, three votes against (Cuba, Yemen, and Zimbabwe), and two abstentions (the People's Republic of China and India).

France, the United Kingdom, and United States used Resolution 688 to establish Iraqi no-fly zones to protect humanitarian operations in Iraq, though the resolution made no explicit reference to no-fly zones.

See also
 1991 uprisings in Iraq
 Gulf War
 Invasion of Kuwait
 Iraqi no-fly zones
 List of United Nations Security Council Resolutions 601 to 700 (1987–1991)

References

External links
 
Text of the Resolution at undocs.org

 0688
 0688
History of Kuwait
1991 in Iraq
April 1991 events